Michael Aushenker is an independent American comic-book artist and creator based in Los Angeles, California, best known for the comic book series El Gato, Crime Mangler. He has also created Chipmunks & Squirrels, Those Unstoppable Rogues, and Cartoon Flophouse (featuring the absurdist Euro-flavored bellhop strip Greenblatt the Great!), and his work has appeared in such publications as Heavy Metal (magazine) (his "Professor Pap" series and other gag strips in the magazine's "Strip Tease" section), Duplex Planet (# 11), Instant Classics, The Stranger, Cake, and Filth.

The "El Gato, Crime Mangler" series includes The Nine Lives of El Gato, Crime Mangler (1995), ¡Holy Ghost El Gato! (1999), Futureshock: El Gato 2002 (2000), and The Nine Loves of El Gato, Crime Mangler (2003).

Aushenker freelances as a screenwriter and continues to write comic books for various companies, including Bongo Comics Group and Heroic Publishing. He wrote a two-part Liberty Girl story for the latter, the first of which was released in Liberty Comics # 1, September 2007. On September 18, 2007, El Muerto, a film starring Wilmer Valderrama and Tony Plana, based on the Javier Hernandez comic book El Muerto, Aztec Zombie, was released on DVD, for which Aushenker contributed a painting on the disc's gallery section.

Biography 
Aushenker graduated from Fairfax High School in Los Angeles. In 1991, he graduated from Cornell University, where he majored in fine arts and creative writing. While attending Cornell, at the age of 19, Aushenker authored and illustrated the children's book Get That Goat! (Landmark Editions) and co-founded and co-edited Strip! magazine, a student cartoonist quarterly, with a collective that included Andrice Arp, Bishakh Som, and Howard Arey (who have since formed Hi-Horse Comics) and Patty Lin (a writer/producer on Freaks and Geeks and the first season of Desperate Housewives). In 1992, following college, Caliber Press published his first comic book, a one-shot humor anthology dubbed Bound & Gagged that featured such Aushenker creations as "The Debunker" and "Stunt Nun." Soon after, Heavy metal magazine published his humor comics in their Strip Tease section, which included Professor Pap, Bachelor Emeritus, a sci-fi gag strip.

Past jobs include a staff writer position at a community newspaper weekly, The Jewish Journal of Greater Los Angeles (1997–2003), where he won a 2002 Simon Rockower Award for "Excellence in Personality Profiles" and interviewed subjects such as Sam Raimi and Sarah Silverman before they broke into the mainstream, as well as wrote articles on comic-book icons Stan Lee, Jack Kirby and Will Eisner before superhero movies by said creators began to dominate Hollywood; and a stint writing movie poster copy, during which Aushenker crafted slogans for print ad campaigns for I Know What You Did Last Summer ("If you want to bury the truth, make sure it stays buried"), Eve's Bayou ("Love can lead you to a dangerous place..."), The Game, and Space Truckers.

In 2004, Aushenker co-wrote an unproduced feature comedy for the writing/producing team of Alfred Gough and Miles Millar under their deal with Disney. He has also co-written a feature film comedy for Urban Entertainment, the producers of "Undercover Brother."

Aushenker was hired to SpongeBob SquarePants in its fourth season.

Aushenker is a contributing writer for Back Issue!, a TwoMorrows publication devoted to comics from the 1970s and 1980s. His first article, about Marvel Comics' short-lived The Human Fly, ran in the January 2007 issue (# 20). Subsequent issues featured his articles on Son of Satan, Captain America and the Falcon, Deathlok the Demolisher, and Mr. T comics.

Aushenker is among the alternative cartoonists (along with Russ Heath and Dean Yeagle) appearing in a comic book convention-themed episode of the hit CBS series NUMB3RS. The episode's original air date: November 23, 2007.

In January 2008, Aushenker began writing regularly for the Lifestyle section of the Palisadian-Post, the 80-year-old official newspaper of Pacific Palisades, California. Aushenker's articles have included profiles of Seymour Cassel, Gavin MacLeod, Marion Ross, and Stacy Peralta, as well as coverage of appearances by Ray Bradbury and Isabel Allende and a behind-the-scenes article on Blake Edwards' The Party.

A new imprint, Urban Golem, began publishing a volume two of Cartoon Flophouse comic book of gag cartoons featuring Greenblatt the Great!. The comic book enjoyed its official debut at the Alternative Press Expo in November 2008. Cartoon Flophouse Featuring Greenblatt the Great! # 2 came out at Alternative Press Expo in October 2009, alongside another Aushenker release, the all-ages comic Silly Goose. Aushenker also released  Cartoon Flophouse Featuring Greenblatt the Great! # 3 and # 4, and a Greenblatt the Great! collection available through Amazon.

Aushenker is currently working on several new comics for various companies. For Bongo Comics he wrote the cover story of Bart Simpson #70. Wildcard Ink publisher Mel Smith announced at Wonder Con in March 2008 that the Gumby comics series will be called Gumby's Gang Starring..., and each book will spotlight a different Gumby supporting character, including Prickle, Goo, and The Blockheads. The first Gumby's Gang comic, focusing on Pokey, featured art by Rafael Navarro and made its debut at San Diego Comic-Con International in July 2010. His work has also been appearing in Australian anthologies Blackguard and Milk Shadow Books' Yuck!.

In 2011, Aushenker did an Those Unstoppable Rogues cover for Yuck! #5. In March 2013, four unpublished stories ran in Yuck! #7. He also released a slew of CartoonFlophouse comics in recent years: Those Unstoppable Rogues Party Hard!, a collection of "Unstoppable Rogues" strips and History Will Be Served, a trade paperback of the complete Greenblatt the Great! strips.

In December 2012, TwoMorrows named Aushenker associate editor of Comic Book Creator, a new magazine by former Comic Book Artist editor Jon B. Cooke, to debut April 2013. In February 2013, it was announced that Aushenker is editing and contributing to The New Adventures of the Human Fly, a new annual comic book anthology reviving The Human Fly, basis for a short-lived but popular 1970s Marvel Comics drawn by Frank Robbins, Frank Springer and Lee Elias. The new Human Fly book debuted at San Diego Comic-Con International in July 2013 before reaching the direct market. Among the writers and artists participating: Marvel Human Fly artists Bob Layton, Steve Leialoha, Al Milgrom and Don Perlin, Unknown Soldier artist Gerry Talaoc, Javier Hernandez, Rafael Navarro, former Marvel artists Steven Butler and John Heebink, and Femme Fatale writer/creator/showrunner Steve Kriozere. Aushenker also wrote about Frank Robbins' final years in Mexico for Comic Book Creator #1.

Since the release of Comic Book Creator, Aushenker has contributed many articles, including profiles of Frank Robbins and interviews with Stan Goldberg,  Irwin Hasen, Denys Cowan, Rutu Modan, Rich Buckler, Pablo Marcos and Cowboy Henk creators Kamagurka & Herr Seele. He also contributed one article on Rock 'N' Roll Biographies to another Jon B. Cooke publication, ACE Magazine.

In May 2013, Aushenker joined The Argonaut Newspaper as staff writer, handling arts, entertainment and culture writing for the Los Angeles Westside weekly. His articles have included cover stories on the Santa Monica history of Popeye the Sailor, Ray Manzarek of The Doors, the rise and fall of special effects house Rhythm & Hues, profiles on Louiche Mayorga of Suicidal Tendencies and Weezer front man Rivers Cuomo and behind-the-scenes stories on the photographers of L.A.'s punk rock scene featuring Ed Colver and The Circle Jerks Lucky Lehrer; and Ric Menello and Adam Dubin and the Venice shoot for the L.L. Cool J video Going Back to Cali.

In early 2014, Aushenker wrote biographical comics based on a roster of metal and punk groups, including Slayer, Judas Priest, Exodus, Testament, NOFX, GWAR and Rob Zombie / White Zombie. The first of these comics were released in comic book shops in 2015: Slayer (March 25) and Exodus (Dec.).

In August 2014 at Stocktoncon in Stockton, California, Aushenker debuted two issues of Go, Genius, Go!, a three-issue series he created/wrote under his CartoonFlophouse imprint, with artist Marcus Collar drawing and inking. A trade paperback collection of all three issues is in the works for 2016.

In 2015, Aushenker is releasing Trolls, a comic book about Edward and Wayward, two slackers working as air traffic controllers who, in the middle of a double-shift, throw a party at work while the boss is away and then promptly fall asleep as bedlam ensues. Originally meant as an Those Unstoppable Rogues book, the new comic is set to debut at Long Beach Comic-Con in September 2015.

Aushenker recently returned to screenwriting, working on an independent movie, currently in development. No further details are available at this date.

See also 
Big Umbrella

External links 
Official Web site

/Cartoon Flophouse Humor Comics official page
TwoMorrows Publishing
The Argonaut

American comics artists
American comics writers
Cornell University College of Architecture, Art, and Planning alumni
Living people
1969 births
Fairfax High School (Los Angeles) alumni